Wang Jie (born 14 January 1989) is a Chinese footballer who currently plays as a defensive midfielder or centre-back for Nantong Zhiyun.

Club career
Wang Jie started his professional football career in 2010 when he was promoted to Chinese Super League side Jiangsu Sainty's first squad. He failed to establish himself within the team and transferred to China League Two side Shenzhen Fengpeng in July 2013. In January 2014, Wang moved to China League One side Tianjin Songjiang on a free transfer. 

At Tianjin he scored his first senior goal on 4 May 2014 in a 2–1 home victory against Yanbian FC. Wang kept his starting position in the 2016 season when Quanjian Nature Medicine took over the club. He made 27 league appearances as Tianjin Quanjian won the title and promoted to the Chinese Super League. He made his Super League debut on 4 March 2017 in a 2–0 away loss against Guangzhou R&F. On 8 April 2018, Wang scored the winner as well as his first goal in the Super League in a 1–0 away win over Guizhou Hengfeng. On 15 May 2018, he scored the equalizer in the second leg of round of 16 of 2018 AFC Champions League against Guangzhou Evergrande as Tianjin Quanjian advanced to the quarter-finals on away goals. Unfortunately this would be the highlight of his time at the club because the owners would face financial difficulties and at the end of the 2019 Chinese Super League season, dissolved the club.   

On 1 July 2020, Wang joined second tier club Changchun Yatai. He would go on to be part of the team that gained promotion to the top tier and won the 2020 China League One division title. The following season he would struggle to gain any playing time and on 26 April 2022 he would return to Jiangsu to join second tier club Nantong Zhiyun. He would go on to make his debut for them in a league game on 8 June 2022 against Suzhou Dongwu in a 1-0 victory. He would go on to establish himself within the team and helped the club gain promotion to the top tier at the end of the 2022 China League One season.

Career statistics
.

Honours

Club
Tianjin Quanjian F.C.
China League One: 2016
Changchun Yatai
 China League One: 2020

References

External links
 

1989 births
Living people
Chinese footballers
Sportspeople from Nantong
Footballers from Jiangsu
Jiangsu F.C. players
Tianjin Tianhai F.C. players
Changchun Yatai F.C. players
Chinese Super League players
China League One players
China League Two players
Association football midfielders